Puimanyons or Pumanyons is a hamlet located in the municipality of La Pobla de Segur, in Province of Lleida province, Catalonia, Spain. As of 2020, it has a population of 3.

References

Populated places in the Province of Lleida